Dad's Root Beer is an American brand of root beer that was created in Chicago in 1937 by Ely Klapman and Barney Berns. It is currently owned by Hedinger Brands, LLC, and sold and marketed by the Dad's Root Beer Company LLC.

History
Dad's Root Beer was established in the 1930s by partners Barney Berns and Ely Klapman in the basement of Klapman's Chicago-area home. The first trademark registration was filed on September 24, 1938, granted on February 14, 1939, to the Dad's Root Beer Company of Chicago, with the product name in use since February 1937. Jules Klapman, son of co-founder Ely, successfully took the Dad's brand international. The name Dad's Old Fashioned Root Beer was selected in honor of Ely Klapman's father.

Dad's Root Beer was the first product to use the six pack format invented by the Atlanta Paper Company in the 1940s. Dad's also introduced the half-gallon bottle, becoming the first brand to market this size. Dad's was marketed as a family: the "Junior" size was the smallest, 7, 10 or 12 ounces. "Mama" was a quart bottle, and "Papa" was a half gallon. (The image of the young boy featured on the "Junior" size bottle is Barney Berns' son, Gene.) A common promotion in the 1940s was the 1 cent sale - purchase the Papa half gallon at regular price and get the Mama quart for 1 cent.

The Klapman and Berns families sold rights to the Dad's name and logo to IC Industries of Chicago in 1971.

The Monarch Beverage Company of Atlanta acquired Dad's from IC Industries in 1986.  At that time Dad's was distributed by the Coca-Cola bottler network, sold 12 million cases annually, and held the second largest share of the root beer category behind A & W.

In 2007 Dad's Root Beer was purchased, along with the Bubble Up, Dr. Wells, and Sun Crest brands, by Hedinger Brands, LLC and licensed to the Dad's Root Beer Company, LLC. The company headquarters is now located in Jasper, Indiana.

Flavors

Dad's makes the following brands/flavors:
 Dad's Old Fashioned Root Beer
 Diet Dad's Old Fashioned Root Beer
 Dad's Old Fashioned Cream Soda
 Dad's Old Fashioned Orange Cream Soda
 Dad's Old Fashioned Red Cream Soda
 Dad's Old Fashioned Blue Cream Soda
 Bubble Up
 Sun Crest Orange
 Dr. Wells

Advertising
The company's signs on the Edens Expressway (I-94) and one near Lake Shore Drive asking "Have you had it lately?" became fixtures on the Chicago landscape. 

The product's jingle was a simple line sung several times, to a conga beat, with the "kick" coming on "Beer":

In the mid-1950s, Dad's sponsored on a regional basis the syndicated TV adventure series Sheena, Queen of the Jungle.

During the 1970s, Chicago-based television advertising for Dad's featured a different jingle sung by an ensemble with the following lyrics:

(Announcer would read the ad copy while a short instrumental section of the jingle played, then the song continued)

IndyCar sponsorship
Dad's Root Beer became an IndyCar Series associate sponsor in 2007. The company continued the relationship until 2011.

See also

References

External links

 Official website
 Beverage Review

2007 mergers and acquisitions
Dad's Root Beer brands
Root beer
Food and drink companies established in 1937
1937 establishments in Illinois
Food and drink companies based in Indiana